Rhinatrema nigrum, the black caecilian, is a species of caecilian in the family Rhinatrematidae found in Guyana, Venezuela, and possibly Brazil. Its natural habitats are subtropical or tropical moist lowland forests, subtropical or tropical moist montane forests, rivers, and intermittent rivers.

Taxonomy
This species was first described by the American herpetologist Emmett Reid Dunn in 1942 as Rhinatrema nigrum, the type locality being Arundabara, British Guiana. It has been included in the genus Epicrionops as Epicrionops niger.

Distribution and habitat
The black caecilian is native to south eastern Venezuela and western Guyana, and possibly northern Brazil. Only four specimens have been recorded, and it is likely that the range of this species is in reality wider than is currently known. Whether the species can adapt to secondary habitats is unknown.

Ecology
As an amphibian, this caecilian is likely to feed on insects, earthworms and other small invertebrates. Clutches of eggs have been found under rocks, where they are guarded by the female. The larvae probably develop in streams.

Status
The black caecilian has a wide distribution in an area with very little human disturbance, and is known to be present in Canaima National Park in Venezuela. Although the total population size is unknown, the species is believed to be common with few known threats, and the International Union for Conservation of Nature has assessed its conservation status as being of "least concern".

References

Rhinatrematidae
Amphibians described in 1942
Amphibians of Guyana
Amphibians of Brazil
Taxonomy articles created by Polbot